Galdogob District is a district in the north-central Mudug region of Somalia. Its capital is Galdogob.

References
galdogob waxay leedahay airabor intarntional ah oo loo,dhameeyay qalabkii uu ubahnaa airabort 2-2-2022 kusoo dhawada,walaalayal gacmo furan ,
ugaas ahmed intarntional airbort
      GALDOGOB;

External links
 Districts of Somalia
 Administrative map of Galdogob District

Districts of Somalia

Mudug